Benedict Campbell (born June 12, 1957) is a Canadian actor whose work has consisted primarily of providing voices for television cartoons, video games and acting on stage, particularly at Canada's Stratford Festival between 1965 and 2000.  Early in his career, Campbell also appeared in a number of live action works.

Family
Campbell comes from an acting family; his parents are Douglas Campbell and Ann Casson, and he is the brother of Dirk Campbell. Campbell's maternal grandparents are Sir Lewis Casson and Dame Sybil Thorndike.

While working in England, Campbell met Jackie Maxwell, who was working as an usher at Contact Theatre. The two later married and, when Campbell was offered work in Troilus and Cressida at the National Arts Centre, the two relocated to Canada.

Filmography

Live-action
 Act of Dishonour (2010) - Dave
 Republic of Doyle (2014) - Judge Richardson
 Slings and Arrows (2005) - Director #1
 The Sheldon Kennedy Story (1999) - Brandon Player #1
 A Holiday to Remember (1995) - Mr. Paul
 Zero Patience (1993)
 Street Legal (1992–1993) - Lorne Cassidy
 The Boys from Syracuse (1986) - Dromio of Syracuse

Animation
 Ice Princess Lily (2018) - Arktos/Little Arktos (voice)
 Babar and the Adventures of Badou (2010–2011) - Additional voices
 Friends and Heroes (2007) - Samuel (voice)
 Jane and the Dragon (2006) - Sir Ivon Mackay, Chamberlain Milton Turnkey (voice)
 The Berenstain Bears (2003–2004) - Papa Q. Bear (voice)
 Redwall (1999) - Martin the Warrior / King Bull Sparra / Darkclaw (voice)
 Mythic Warriors: Guardians of the Legend (1998–2000) - Additional voices
 Noddy (1998) - Mr. Plod, Big Ears, Mr. Tubby Bear, Clockwork Clown, Bunky (voice)
 Freaky Stories (1997) - Narrator
 Donkey Kong Country (1996–2000) - King K. Rool (voice)
 Stickin' Around (1996) - Principal Coffin (voice)
 Ace Ventura: Pet Detective (1996) - Additional voices
 Monster Force (1994) - Additional voices
 Highlander: The Animated Series (1994–1995) - Don Vincente Marino Ramírez (voice)

Video games
 Resident Evil 3: Nemesis (1999) - Mikhail Victor

Stratford Festival Theatre credits
 Hamlet (2000), Hamlet
 Julius Caesar (1998), Marcus Antonius
 Romeo and Juliet (1997), Friar Laurence
 Taming of the Shrew (1997), Hortensio
 Macbeth (1995), Banquo
 Cymbeline (1986), Cloten
 The Winter's Tale (1986), Young Shepherd
 King Lear (1985), Edmund
 Twelfth Night (1985), Antonio
 A Midsummer Night's Dream (1984), Demetrius
 Love's Labour's Lost (1984), Ferdinand
 The Merchant of Venice (1984), Arragon
 Falstaff (Henry IV, Part II) (1965), Page to Falstaff

References

External links

1957 births
Living people
Canadian male television actors
Canadian male video game actors
Canadian male voice actors
Male actors from Montreal
Canadian people of Scottish descent
Canadian people of English descent
20th-century Canadian male actors
21st-century Canadian male actors